Carlos Eccehomo Cuesta Figueroa (9 March 1999) is a Colombian professional footballer who plays as a defender for Belgian Pro League club Genk and the Colombia national team.

Club career

KRC Genk
On 5 July 2019 Belgian club K.R.C. Genk announced, that they had signed Cuesta on a contract until June 2024.

International career
He made his debut for Colombia national football team on 9 September 2021 in a World Cup qualifier against Chile.

Honours
Genk
Belgian Cup: 2020–21

References

External links
Carlos Cuesta at Genk's website

1999 births
Living people
People from Quibdó
Colombian footballers
Colombia under-20 international footballers
Colombia youth international footballers
Colombia international footballers
Colombian expatriate footballers
Association football defenders
Categoría Primera A players
Belgian Pro League players
Atlético Nacional footballers
K.R.C. Genk players
2021 Copa América players
Expatriate footballers in Belgium
Colombian expatriate sportspeople in Belgium
Sportspeople from Chocó Department